Carl Wilson is an American politician from Oregon. He was the minority leader and House Republican Leader in the Oregon House of Representatives from January to September 2019. He represented District 3 in the Oregon House from 1998 to 2003, and again from 2015 to 2021. He served as Leader of the House Republican Caucus in the 78th Legislative Assembly.

Personal life
Wilson is a resident of Grants Pass. He joined the United States Navy after graduating from high school in 1971 and served as a radioman until 1973. He is married with two adult children.

References

1955 births
21st-century American politicians
Living people
Republican Party members of the Oregon House of Representatives
People from Grants Pass, Oregon
United States Navy sailors